Distagnostus is a genus of trilobite in the order Agnostida, which existed in what is now Queensland, Australia. It was described by Shergold in 1972, and the type species is Distagnostus ergodes.

References

Agnostidae
Agnostida genera
Trilobites of Australia